Pantukan, officially the Municipality of Pantukan, is a 1st class municipality in the province of Davao de Oro, Philippines. According to the 2020 census, it has a population of 90,786 people.

History
In 1914, Governor General Charles Yeater declared Pantukan as a municipal district. Sangui, a Mansaka, was appointed president. A year after, he was replaced by Bancas Mansaka. On November 13, 1936, President Manuel L. Quezon declared it a regular municipality, therefore becoming the oldest town in Davao de Oro province. Teodoro Fuentes was appointed its first Alkalde. Juan Caballero Sr. was its first elected Mayor. From then up to the present, the elected mayors were: Graciano Arafol (1952-1959), Diosdado Basanez (1960-1963), Celso Sarenas (1964-) with Juan Caballero, Jr. as OIC (1986-1987), Jovito Derla (1988-1992), Juan Caballero, Jr. (1992-1995), Jovita Derla (1995-2004), Tok Sarenas (2004-2013), Roberto Yugo (2013–2022) and Leonel Ceniza (2022-Present).

Geography

Climate

Barangays
Pantukan is politically subdivided into 13 barangays.

 Bongabong
 Bongbong
 P. Fuentes
 Kingking (Poblacion)
 Magnaga
 Matiao
 Napnapan
 Tagdangua
 Tambongon
 Tibagon
 Las Arenas
 Araibo
 Tagugpo

Demographics

Economy

The municipality is primarily dependent on mining but agriculture thrives in communities within its boundary. While small scale mining operates in the town, a large mining operator has been granted permit to explore gold in the area. Gold deposits in Barangay Kingking alone is estimated to be at 10.3 million ounces with copper deposits of 5.4 billion pounds. Nationwide Development Corporation (Nadecor) holds the Mineral Production Sharing Agreement (MPSA) for the Kingking mine site.

References

External links
 Pantukan Profile at the DTI Cities and Municipalities Competitive Index
 [ Philippine Standard Geographic Code]
Philippine Census Information

Municipalities of Davao de Oro
Mining communities in the Philippines
Establishments by Philippine executive order